El Vadila (lit. Virtue) is an Islamist political party in Mauritania, led by Ethmane Ould Ahmed Aboulmaaly.

History
The party was registered in 2006. It won three seats in the 2013 parliamentary elections.

References

Political parties in Mauritania